Rüdiger Rehm (born 22 November 1978) is a German former footballer and current coach.

Managerial statistics

References

External links

1978 births
Living people
German footballers
Association football midfielders
SV Waldhof Mannheim players
1. FC Saarbrücken players
SSV Reutlingen 05 players
FC Erzgebirge Aue players
Kickers Offenbach players
FSV Oggersheim players
SG Sonnenhof Großaspach players
3. Liga managers
2. Bundesliga managers
Arminia Bielefeld managers
SV Wehen Wiesbaden managers
SG Sonnenhof Großaspach managers
FC Ingolstadt 04 managers
German football managers
Sportspeople from Heilbronn
Footballers from Baden-Württemberg